Louise Jukes (born 14 April 1984) is a British handball player. She has played for the British national team, and competed at the 2012 Summer Olympics in London. She was born in Ashford, Kent.

Prior to taking up handball, Jukes was a hockey player, representing England at under-18s level and playing for Old Loughtonians Hockey Club. She became a handball player after taking part in the Sporting Giants scheme.

Following the Olympics, Jukes helped found Ipswich Handball Club, alongside David Hendrick.

References

External links

British female handball players
1984 births
Living people
Handball players at the 2012 Summer Olympics
Olympic handball players of Great Britain
People from Ashford, Kent